Tundra Mine/Salamita Mine Aerodrome  is a registered aerodrome that served the Tundra and Salmita Mines in the Northwest Territories, Canada.

References

Registered aerodromes in the North Slave Region